Iron disilicide (FeSi2) is an intermetallic compound, a silicide of iron that occurs in nature as the rare mineral linzhiite. At room temperature it forms orthorhombic crystals (β phase), which convert into a tetragonal α phase upon heating to 970 °C.

See also
Ferrosilicon

References

Iron compounds
Transition metal silicides